Carlos Newton (born August 17, 1976) is an Anguillian-born Canadian retired mixed martial artist. He is a former UFC Welterweight Champion and Pride FC Japan MMA Legend. Known as "The Ronin", he competed worldwide in the biggest MMA organizations including UFC, Pride FC, IFL, K-1, Shooto and most recently W-1. He is a 3rd Degree Brazilian Jiu-Jitsu Black Belt alongside his coach Terry Riggs under Renzo Gracie, at Warrior MMA in Newmarket, Ontario. Newton has always been considered a fan favourite and a "Submission Master" and has dubbed his personal fighting style — an amalgam of Brazilian Jiu-Jitsu, Judo, Wrestling, Karate, and Boxing — as "Dragon Ball Jiu-Jitsu" in tribute to Dragon Ball, a Japanese manga and anime franchise. As a testament to his worldwide popularity, Newton is one of only a few MMA athletes to ever be allowed to compete in the UFC and Pride FC at the same time. In Canada he is respected as a mixed martial arts pioneer, he was the first Canadian UFC Champion at UFC 31 (Welterweight) defeating Pat Miletich.

Early life
Carlos Newton was born in Anguilla and moved to Canada at a young age. He attended Westview Centennial Secondary School in the Jane and Finch area of Toronto, Ontario. Newton competed in numerous Jiu-Jitsu and BJJ competitions in Canada and across the world, starting under the legendary Tom Sharkey. Notably the prestigious Abu Dhabi Combat Club in Abu Dhabi, United Arab Emirates against Rodrigo Gracie of the legendary Gracie family. Newton started his Jiu-Jitsu competing career out of the Samurai Club in Toronto. Shortly after, in 1996, Terry Riggs founded Warrior Mixed Martial Arts in Newmarket, Ontario, which was Canada's first official MMA Academy; Newton followed his long time training partner and made it his home. Out of Warrior MMA, Newton's career flourished under the coaching of Terry Riggs and Everton McEwan. Newton, a Toronto York University student, did his study on geriatric medicine, having done research at Baycrest Hospital, one of the world leaders in geriatric care.

Mixed martial arts career
Newton's professional mixed martial arts career began at the early age of 19, as the youngest no-holds-barred extreme fighter ever. His first match was one of the most memorable "David vs Goliath" NHB fights in history, with Newton giving up over 100 lbs to a much larger Jean Rivière on the Extreme Fighting 2 card in April 1996. After dominating much of the fight, it ended with a submission loss due to sheer exhaustion for Newton, however, the spectacle of the brave smaller fighter launched his career. Newton competed in the world's top mixed martial arts organizations such as Shooto, K-1 and Pride Fighting Championships in Japan, UFC in America and W-1 in Canada.

Pride FC and Shooto Japan
Newton started his famed Japan fight career with a win over Erik Paulson to become the Vale Tudo Japan World Champion. After a few dominating fights in the Shooto organization he then moved on to PRIDE FC considered to be the top MMA show in the world along with the UFC. In June 1998, Newton lost a technical bout in Pride Fighting Championships against Kazushi Sakuraba. The Sakuraba vs. Newton fight is remembered today as a classic and one of the best MMA fights ever for submission grappling fans. This legendary fight propelled both fighters to MMA superstardom.  Newton went on in the PRIDE Japan to rack up wins over Daijiro Matsui, Naoki Sano, Johil de Oliveira, all on his way to a spectacular armbar victory over  "Pelé" José Landi-Jons at Pride 19 in February, 2002. After this win Pride President Naoto Morishita declared, "Newton is considered the unofficial PRIDE middle weight Champion". In October, 2003 Newton further solidified his place in history with a split-decision victory over the estimable Renzo Gracie at Pride Bushido 1.

Ultimate Fighting Championships
Newton's fourth and fifth fights marked his UFC debut at UFC 17, defeating Bob Gilstrap and losing a controversial decision to Dan Henderson on the same night for the middle weight tournament title. Newton's greatest professional accomplishment in his career was capturing the UFC Welterweight Championship from Pat Miletich in May 2001 at UFC 31. The reign was short lived however, as Newton lost his first title defense  in November of that same year at UFC 34 against accomplished wrestler Matt Hughes. Newton had a triangle choke locked in on Hughes, but Hughes picked up Newton, walked him to the corner, and attempted to slam him. Newton placed his arm over the side of the cage to prevent the slam, causing John McCarthy to warn him, before Hughes seemed to lose consciousness and fall to the mat while still holding Newton, causing Newton to hit his head and also lose consciousness. With Hughes slow to get up and Newton out cold on the mat, McCarthy would award the victory to Hughes via KO. The ending of the fight proved to be controversial, as many believed that Hughes was unconscious prior to Newton, who should have been awarded the victory as a result.

K-1 HEROs
Newton was set for a comeback fight at K-1's HEROs MMA promotion against Melvin Manhoef at the Ariake Coliseum on August 5, but had to pull out of the fight at the last minute due to a torn ligament in his knee. He made a second attempt at a comeback in K-1 HEROs, this time facing Tokimitsu Ishizawa. Newton made short work of the Japanese fighter, needing only four punches to score the TKO victory in just 22 seconds. He then faced Shungo Oyama at Hero's Korea 2007 where he lost by submission due to punches.

International Fight League
Newton and Riggs were the coaches of the Toronto Dragons in the IFL in the 2005 and 2006 seasons. Based out of Warrior MMA in Newmarket, the Dragons were made up of international notable fighters such as Claude Patrick, Wagnney Fabiano, Brent Beauparlant, Rafael Cavalcante, Leo Santos and Dennis Hallman. The Dragons made the playoffs in 2006 season and went on as far as the semifinals round. Wagnney Fabiano from the team qualified and won the IFL Lightweight Championship. Newton fought in a superfight that year and lost to Renzo Gracie by way of an extremely controversial split decision at the IFL Championship Final. Gracie himself questioned the call after the fight.

W-1
Carlos, motivated by a chance to compete in Canada, made a return to MMA again 2009 at Warrior-1: Inception. He scored a first round victory by way of KO against Nabil Khatib, this was Carlos's first fight on Canadian soil in 13 years. He again returned to action on October 10, 2009 against former UFC veteran "Mr. International" Shonie Carter at Warrior-1: High Voltage. The bout was to be for the Warrior-1 Welterweight Championship, but because Newton did not make weight, it was a non-title bout. Newton beat Carter by unanimous decision after three rounds.

In 2009, after his win over Shonie Carter, he stated in an interview to Sherdog that he was anticipating his return to fighting abroad with particular interest in Japan. However, after one more fight in Australia, Newton decided, that after a successful fight career that spanned 14 years, it was finally time to take a break and focus on coaching.

Following his retirement, Newton had coached at his home gym, Warrior Mixed Martial Arts, in Newmarket, Ontario, until he eventually opened and begun coaching at his own gym, Newton Mixed Martial Arts, in Pickering, Ontario.

Accomplishments
Jiu-Jitsu
Canadian Jiu-Jitsu Champion (5 times) (including Open Weight Champion)
Pankration
Canadian Pankration Champion (2 times)
Ultimate Fighting Championship
UFC Welterweight Championship (One time)
First Canadian champion in UFC history
UFC 17 Middleweight Tournament Runner Up

Mixed martial arts record

|-
| Loss
| align=center| 16–14
| Brian Ebersole
| Decision (unanimous)
| Impact FC 1
| 
| align=center| 3
| align=center| 5:00
| Brisbane, Australia
| 
|-
| Win
| align=center| 16–13
| Shonie Carter
| Decision (unanimous)
| Warrior-1: High Voltage
| 
| align=center| 3
| align=center| 5:00
| Gatineau, Quebec, Canada
| 
|-
| Win
| align=center| 15–13
| Nabil Khatib
| KO (punches)
| Warrior-1: Inception
| 
| align=center| 1
| align=center| 3:12
| Gatineau, Quebec, Canada
| 
|-
| Loss
| align=center| 14–13
| Shungo Oyama
| Submission (punches)
| Hero's 2007 in Korea
| 
| align=center| 3
| align=center| 2:42
| Seoul, South Korea
| 
|-
| Loss
| align=center| 14–12
| Matt Lindland
| Submission (guillotine choke)
| IFL – Houston
| 
| align=center| 2
| align=center| 1:43
| Houston, Texas, United States
| 
|-
| Loss
| align=center| 14–11
| Renzo Gracie
| Decision (split)
| IFL Championship Final
| 
| align=center| 3
| align=center| 4:00
| Uncasville, Connecticut, United States
| 
|-
| Win
| align=center| 14–10
| Tokimitsu Ishizawa
| TKO (punches)
| Hero's 7
| 
| align=center| 1
| align=center| 0:22
| Yokohama, Japan
| 
|-
| Loss
| align=center| 13–10
| Ryo Chonan
| Decision (unanimous)
| Pride Bushido 5
| 
| align=center| 2
| align=center| 5:00
| Osaka, Japan
| 
|-
| Loss
| align=center| 13–9
| Daiju Takase
| Decision (split)
| Pride Bushido 3
| 
| align=center| 2
| align=center| 5:00
| Yokohama, Japan
| 
|-
| Loss
| align=center| 13–8
| Renato Verissimo
| Decision (unanimous)
| UFC 46 
| 
| align=center| 3
| align=center| 5:00
| Las Vegas, Nevada, United States
| 
|-
| Win
| align=center| 13–7
| Renzo Gracie
| Decision (split)
| Pride Bushido 1
| 
| align=center| 2
| align=center| 5:00
| Saitama, Japan
| 
|-
| Loss
| align=center| 12–7
| Anderson Silva
| KO (flying knee and punches)
| Pride 25
| 
| align=center| 1
| align=center| 6:27
| Yokohama, Japan
| 
|-
| Win
| align=center| 12–6
| Pete Spratt
| Submission (kimura)
| UFC 40 
| 
| align=center| 1
| align=center| 1:45
| Las Vegas, Nevada, United States
| 
|-
| Loss
| align=center| 11–6
| Matt Hughes
| TKO (punches)
| UFC 38 
| 
| align=center| 4
| align=center| 3:35
| London, England
| 
|-
| Win
| align=center| 11–5
| Jose Landi-Jons
| Submission (armbar)
| Pride 19
| 
| align=center| 1
| align=center| 7:16
| Saitama, Japan
| 
|-
| Loss
| align=center| 10–5
| Matt Hughes
| KO (slam)
| UFC 34 
| 
| align=center| 2
| align=center| 1:27
| Las Vegas, Nevada, United States
| 
|-
| Win
| align=center| 10–4
| Pat Miletich
| Submission (bulldog choke)
| UFC 31 
| 
| align=center| 3
| align=center| 2:50
| Atlantic City, New Jersey, United States
| 
|-
| Loss
| align=center| 9–4
| Dave Menne
| Decision (unanimous)
| Shidokan Jitsu – Warriors War 1
| 
| align=center| 1
| align=center| 10:00
| Kuwait
| 
|-
| Win
| align=center| 9–3
| Johil de Oliveira
| Decision (unanimous)
| Pride 12 - Cold Fury
| 
| align=center| 2
| align=center| 10:00
| Saitama, Japan
| 
|-
| Win
| align=center| 8–3
| Yuhi Sano
| Submission (armbar)
| Pride 9
| 
| align=center| 1
| align=center| 0:40
| Nagoya, Japan
| 
|-
| Win
| align=center| 7–3
| Karl Schmidt
| Submission (armbar)
| WEF 9 – World Class
| 
| align=center| 1
| align=center| 1:12
| Evansville, Indiana, United States
| 
|-
| Win
| align=center| 6–3
| Daijiro Matsui
| Decision (unanimous)
| Pride 6
| 
| align=center| 3
| align=center| 5:00
| Yokohama, Japan
| 
|-
| Win
| align=center| 5–3
| Kenji Kawaguchi
| Submission (armbar)
| Shooto - 10th Anniversary Event
| 
| align=center| 1
| align=center| 5:00
| Yokohama, Japan
| 
|-
| Loss
| align=center| 4–3
| Kazushi Sakuraba
| Submission (kneebar)
| Pride 3
| 
| align=center| 2
| align=center| 5:19
| Tokyo, Japan
| 
|-
| Loss
| align=center| 4–2
| Dan Henderson
| Decision (split)
| UFC 17 
| 
| align=center| 1
| align=center| 15:00
| Mobile, Alabama, US
| 
|-
| Win
| align=center| 4–1
| Bob Gilstrap
| Submission (triangle choke)
| UFC 17 
| 
| align=center| 1
| align=center| 0:52
| Mobile, Alabama, US
| 
|-
| Win
| align=center| 3–1
| Kazuhiro Kusayanagi
| Submission (armbar)
| Shooto - Las Grandes Viajes 2
| 
| align=center| 1
| align=center| 2:17
| Tokyo, Japan
| 
|-
| Win
| align=center| 2–1
| Haim Gozali
| Submission (armbar)
| Israel Fighting Championship - Israel vs. Canada
| 
| align=center| 1
| align=center| N/A
| Israel
| 
|-
| Win
| align=center| 1–1
| Erik Paulson
| Submission (armbar)
| Vale Tudo Japan 1997
| 
| align=center| 1
| align=center| 0:41
| Tokyo, Japan
| 
|-
| Loss
| align=center| 0–1
| Jean Rivière
| Submission (exhaustion)
| Extreme Fighting 2
| 
| align=center| 1
| align=center| 7:22
| Montreal, Quebec, Canada
|

References

External links
 
 

1976 births
Living people
Black Canadian mixed martial artists
Canadian male mixed martial artists
Welterweight mixed martial artists
Canadian practitioners of Brazilian jiu-jitsu
People awarded a black belt in Brazilian jiu-jitsu
Canadian jujutsuka
Mixed martial artists utilizing pankration
Mixed martial artists utilizing jujutsu
Canadian submission wrestlers
Ultimate Fighting Championship champions
York University alumni
Anguillan emigrants to Canada
Sportspeople from Toronto
Ultimate Fighting Championship male fighters